The Sabin S. Murdock House is a historic house in Murdock, Minnesota, United States.  It was built in 1878 for Sabin S. Murdock (1830–1900), who almost singlehandedly founded and promoted the community he named after himself.  The house was listed on the National Register of Historic Places in 1985 for having local significance in the themes of architecture, European ethnic heritage, and exploration/settlement.  It was nominated for being West-central Minnesota's most prominent house of a single individual who established and promoted a rural townsite, and for being the oldest and most architecturally significant Victorian house in Murdock.

See also
 National Register of Historic Places listings in Swift County, Minnesota

References

1878 establishments in Minnesota
Buildings and structures in Swift County, Minnesota
Houses completed in 1878
Houses on the National Register of Historic Places in Minnesota
National Register of Historic Places in Swift County, Minnesota